José Rodrigo da Câmara  (1665 - 1724), member of the Azorean dynastic  Câmara family, he was son of Manuel Luís Baltazar da Câmara (first Count of Ribeira Grande), and by extension the second Count, and 11th Donatary Captain of the island of São Miguel. He spend little time in the Azores.

Biography

Early life
Born in the Azores, nonetheless he was raised and educated, for the most part, in Lisbon. His father died when he was eight years old, and he was invested in the title of Donatary-Captain of the island, under the administration of his ouvidores (councillors) who responded to his mother and tutor.

At the age of 19 he married in Paris, by civil union, the Princess Constance Émilie de Rohan, daughter of the French House of Rohan and Prince of Soubise, with his godparents the King of France.

Donatário
He spent little time in the Captaincy of the São Miguel, and only briefly between 1691 and 1693, then around 1701. The only incentive recorded by this noble was the establishment of a wool textile factory in Ribeira Grande, which was founded in conjunction with his son Luís Manuel da Câmara, who also resided in Paris, and contracted people to handle his affairs locally. This included a master and 52 French workmen, who were sent to work in the establishment.

Later life
He died in Lisbon in 1724, a year after the death of his son.

References
Notes

Sources
 

Camara Jose Rodrigo
1666 births
1724 deaths
Counts of Ribeira Grande
17th-century Portuguese people
18th-century Portuguese people
Gonçalves da Câmara family
Portuguese nobility